Steven J. Clippingdale (born April 29, 1956) is a Canadian former professional ice hockey left winger.

He was drafted in 1976 by both the Los Angeles Kings of the National Hockey League and the Winnipeg Jets of the World Hockey Association, Clippingdale played for the Kings and Washington Capitals.

Career statistics

Awards
 WCHL Second All-Star Team – 1976

External links

Profile at hockeydraftcentral.com

1956 births
Living people
Canadian ice hockey left wingers
Dallas Black Hawks players
Fort Worth Texans players
Hershey Bears players
Los Angeles Kings draft picks
Los Angeles Kings players
New Westminster Bruins players
Ice hockey people from Vancouver
Springfield Falcons players
Washington Capitals players
Winnipeg Jets (WHA) draft picks
Wisconsin Badgers men's ice hockey players